Giorgio Agnelli (12 May 1929 – 11 May 1965) was a member of the Agnelli family.

Early life and family 
Born in Turin, the second son of Virginia Agnelli (born Donna Virginia Bourbon del Monte) and of the industrialist Edoardo Agnelli, he was their sixth child. Until 1996, his older brother Gianni Agnelli was the head of Fiat S.p.A., which was founded by Giovanni Agnelli. He studied at Harvard University in the United States. Unlike the other members of the family, he could not participate in industrial and financial activities due to a serious illness. Considered a family rebel along with Edoardo Agnelli, the eldest child and only son of Gianni and Marella Agnelli who also did not participate in the family business and died by suicide at the age of 46, he was described as caring about his family and suffered from being marginalized.

Death 
Agnelli died at age 35 in a Swiss clinic in Rolle at Lake Geneva, where he had been treated for a long time. According to the poetess Marta Vio, who was his companion for ten years, he had long suffered from schizophrenia. They met in 1946 on the beach of Forte dei Marmi, the holiday resort of the Agnelli family. His death, officially ruled a suicide when he jumped off from the clinic's window, remains a mystery. Italian journalist Antonio Parisi wrote a book about it.

References

Further reading

External links 
 Descendants of Edoardo Agnelli (1892–1935) at BRIGITTE (in English)

1929 births
1965 deaths
Giorgio 1
Bourbon del Monte family
Harvard University alumni
Nobility from Turin
People with schizophrenia
Suicides by drowning in Switzerland